Sanford High School is a public, co-educational, high school in Sanford, Maine, United States.

History

Sanford High began offering high school level classes in 1887, and during the 20th century was the first school in the State of Maine to earn state accreditation and New England accreditation, a status which has since been continuous.  Prior to 1969, the school accepted tuition students from many outlying communities, but space considerations at the building (which eventually became the Willard School) stopped that practice.  A larger facility with a vocational wing that eventually evolved into the Sanford Regional Technical Center, was constructed behind Cobb Stadium, at 52 Sanford High School Boulevard, and opened in 1970.  Growth in enrollment and programming eventually required up to twenty-four classrooms in portable structures around the main building. The last day of classes in the former high school was on October 2, 2018. A new $103,000,000 campus opened on October 10, 2018 at 100 Alumni Boulevard with expanded programs in the regional technical center, integrated academic programs, and state-of-the-art academic, technical, and performing arts facilities as well as much enhanced athletic fields and indoor facilities along with a competition turf field 2,000-seat stadium, dedicated "Alumni Stadium" at its first home football game on August 31, 2018.  The Sanford High School's campus population, as of the 2017-2018 school year, is approximately 1,050 students, along with additional students from seven other sending schools attending the Sanford Regional Technical Center for half-day, year-round programs.  The new facility with additional regional technical offerings is designed for 1,800 students. On November 15th 2022 Sanford highschool alongside several other highschools in Maine were targets of false shooter reports. This resulted in the in school locking down until police evacuated students and staff.

School leadership
Sanford High School has one principal and three assistant principals. Its student leadership is made up of a Student Council as well as four class officers (president, vice president, treasurer, and secretary) from every class. The principal is Matt Petermann.

Competitive activities

Sanford High School is a member of the Southwestern Maine Athletics Association (SMAA) which is in Western Maine Class A. The mascot was the "Redskins" prior to 2012, when the school decided to change their mascot due to claims from the Native American tribes of Maine that it was offensive. The students voted to change their mascot to the "Spartans." The new campus opened in the fall of 2018 and includes the outdoor facilities of Alumni Stadium (American football, soccer, field hockey, lacrosse, track and field), softball field, and tennis courts; in addition, the campus includes sub-varsity and practice fields.  Varsity baseball games will continue to be held at Goodall Park.  Indoor facilities include two gymnasiums as well as fitness and wrestling practice facilities.

The football team was "Class B" State Champion is 1956 and 1959 and "Class A" State Runner-up in 1978 and 1982, State "Class A" Champion in 1998, and Western Maine "Class A" Runner-Up in 1999.  The baseball team won Telegram League championships in 1964 and 1974 and the "Class A" State Championship in 1978.  The girls' basketball team won the "Class A" State Championship in 2006, and the boys' basketball team won the Western Maine "Class LL" Championship in 1967.  The boys' soccer team won the 1999 Western Maine Class "A" Championship.  Other teams have won state championships in Wrestling, Field Hockey, and Girls' Track.

The Sanford High School Marching Band has earned many honors and has performed in the Boston St. Patrick's Day Parade, the New York City St. Patrick's Day Parade, and the 2009 Inaugural Parade in Washington, D.C. as well as state and New England field competitions, Winter Percussion, and Winter Guard.  Mock Trial has earned Western Maine and State Runner-Up honors, and the Sanford Regional Technical Center students earn many awards at the annual Skills USA competitions.

Alumni organizations

The Sanford Alumni Association was founded in March 2015.

Notable alumni
 John Tuttle, state senator
 Vic Firth, businessman, percussionist
 Randy Brooks, nationally famous trumpeter and orchestra leader

References

External links
 
 The Sanford Alumni Association 
 Sanford Schools Legacy Foundation
 Hall of Fame

Public high schools in Maine
Buildings and structures in Sanford, Maine
Schools in York County, Maine